Norbert König (born 4 September 1958) is a German sports presenter.

Career 
König finished his abitur at the Amandus-Abendroth-Gymnasium in Cuxhaven. Since 1987, König presents the ZDF-Sportreportage and in winter the Biathlon-live televisions and in summer the Athletics-live televisions in ZDF.

Since 1988 König reports for ZDF the Summer Olympic Games and the Winter Olympic Games.

Family 
König is married and has got two kids.

References

External links 

1958 births
German television presenters
German sports journalists
German sports broadcasters
20th-century German journalists
21st-century German journalists
Living people
People from Cuxhaven (district)
ZDF people
ZDF heute presenters and reporters